Ameer Sultan (born 5 December 1967) is an Indian film director, producer and actor, working in the Tamil film industry.

Early life and career
Ameer Sultan was born in Madurai, Tamil Nadu India. He initially studied economics and worked as an entrepreneur before starting to work as an assistant director to Tamil filmmaker Bala on his award-winning film Sethu in 1999 and Nandha in 2001. Shortly after, he directed his first film, the romantic comedy Mounam Pesiyadhe (2002). The film starred Suriya in the lead and became Trisha Krishnan's first release featuring her in a leading role. The same year, he began his own production company, Teamwork Production House.

His second directorial was the mystery thriller Raam, which he produced himself. It was released three years later, in 2005. The film, which revolves around an autistic teenager, portrayed by Jiiva, who is highly attached to his mother, but becomes suspected of having murdered her, received critical acclaim, with Jeeva and the film's composer Yuvan Shankar Raja winning awards at the 2005 Cyprus International Film Festival. It also became Jeeva's first successful film in the film industry, who till then, had appeared in two unsuccessful home productions only.

In 2007, he directed the drama Paruthiveeran set in a village in Tamil Nadu, which marked the debut of Karthi, younger son of Sivakumar and brother of Suriya. Karthi as well as Priyamani, who performed the female lead, won several notable prizes for their performances. Paruthiveeran remains Ameer's most acclaimed work, having received six Filmfare Awards South including the Best Film and Best Director trophies, two National Film Awards, two Tamil Nadu State Film Awards and four Vijay Awards. The film further fetched accolades at international platform, winning the Best Film Award at the Osian's Cinefan Festival of Asian and Arab Cinema and Netpac Special Mention award at the Berlin International Film Festival. His fourth directorial, Aadhi Bhagavan, starring Jayam Ravi and Neetu Chandra, released in 2013, to mixed reviews.

Filmography

Controversy
On 24 October 2008, Ameer was arrested. Being a Tamil activist, he took part in a film rally condemning state atrocities against Tamils in Sri Lanka, organised by director Bharathiraja, also a Tamil activist, and other prominent Tamil directors, actors, and producers. The rally was part of statewide protests across Tamil Nadu in 2008 condemning Sri Lanka. During the rally, Ameer and fellow director Seeman made speeches criticising the Indian government and expressing support to the Liberation Tigers of Tamil Eelam, a Tamil separatist group on the island and condemning the genocide of Tamils in Sri Lanka. The two were later released on bail with the help of their assistant directors, Bharathiraja, and actor R. Sarath Kumar. Other Film directors such as Balu Mahendra, Bhagyaraj, Cheran, R K Selvamani, V Sekar, Bala, Rajkapoor, lyricists Arivumathi, Snehan and others waited from 8 am for the two directors' release.

Awards

 2007 – Filmfare Award for Best Film – Tamil – Paruthiveeran
 2007 – Filmfare Award for Best Director – Tamil – Paruthiveeran
 2007 – Osian's Cinefan Festival of Asian and Arab Cinema  – Paruthiveeran
 2007 – Berlin International Film Festival – Special Mention – Paruthiveeran
 2018 – Ananda Vikatan Cinema Award for Best Supporting Actor – Vada Chennai

References

External links
 

Writers from Madurai
Tamil film directors
21st-century Indian dramatists and playwrights
Tamil male actors
Tamil activists
Tamil-language film directors
Tamil screenwriters
Living people
1966 births
Filmfare Awards South winners
21st-century Indian film directors
Male actors from Madurai
Screenwriters from Tamil Nadu
21st-century Indian screenwriters